The Second Dynasty of ancient Egypt (or Dynasty II, c. 2890 – c. 2686 BC) is the latter of the two dynasties of the Egyptian Archaic Period, when the seat of government was centred at Thinis. It is most known for its last ruler, Khasekhemwy, but is otherwise one of the most obscure periods in Egyptian history.

Though archaeological evidence of the time is very scant, contrasting data from the First and Third Dynasties indicates important institutional and economic developments during the Second Dynasty.

Rulers
For the first three pharaohs, sources are fairly close in agreement and the order is supported by an inscription on the statuette of Hetepdief, who served in the mortuary cults of these three kings.

But the identity of the next few rulers is unclear. Surviving sources might be giving the Horus name or the Nebty name and the birth names of these rulers. They may also be entirely different individuals, or could be legendary names. This might never be resolved.

It has been theorised that following the reign of Nynetjer, the country was split and ruled by two successors due to the overly complex state administration of the whole of Egypt.

The following list contains various king names from different sources:

With the last ruler, the sources return to an agreement:

Manetho states Thinis was the capital, as in the First Dynasty, but the first three kings were buried at Saqqara, suggesting the center of power had moved to Memphis. Beyond this, little can be said about the events during this period as the annual records on the Palermo stone only survive to the end of the reign of Nebra and for parts of Nynetjer's. One important event, the unification of Upper and Lower Egypt, might have occurred during the reign of Khasekhemwy as many Egyptologists read his name as "the Two Powers arise".

See also

 
 Early Dynastic Period (Egypt)

References

 
States and territories established in the 3rd millennium BC
States and territories disestablished in the 3rd millennium BC
02
29th century BC in Egypt
28th century BC in Egypt
27th century BC in Egypt
3rd-millennium BC establishments in Egypt
3rd-millennium BC disestablishments in Egypt
3rd millennium BC in Egypt